Yishun Bus Interchange is located in northern Singapore, integrated with Northpoint City. The interchange is part of the Yishun Integrated Transport Hub (ITH), which opened on 8 September 2019. Before this interchange, the original bus interchange was in operation from 23 August 1987 to 13 March 2015. Operations were transferred to a temporary site on 14 March 2015 for the construction of Yishun Integrated Transport Hub (ITH), and eventually closed on 7 September 2019.

History
The original interchange was built at a cost of S$2 million, and it opened on 23 August 1987. It was the first bus interchange in Singapore purpose-built for the Trans-Island Bus Service.

The shops at Block 923 were closed and subsequently demolished in 2012 due to the development plans. Residents who were residing at Block 923 were transferred to a new residential area.

On 17 June 2013, the Housing and Development Board (HDB) released the land parcel where the former interchange and then-demolished HDB flat, Block 923, was located. The land parcel was launched for sale on 28 June 2013.

On 27 February 2015, the Land Transport Authority (LTA) announced the construction and co-location of a new air-conditioned bus interchange with the new Northpoint City integrated development, named the Yishun Integrated Transport Hub (YITH). The new interchange is slated to open in 2019. The Integrated Bus Interchange will be linked to the existing Yishun MRT station by a new underpass under Yishun Avenue 2.

As such, to make way for a new Integrated Transport Hub (ITH), the interchange was relocated to a temporary site across Yishun Central 1 behind Northpoint Shopping Centre on 14 March 2015. The ITH opened on 8 September 2019.

Management
Since 5 September 2021, Yishun Bus Interchange is managed by Tower Transit on a five-year term.

Bus Contracting Model

Under the bus contracting model, all the bus routes were split into 5 route packages operating from Yishun Bus Interchange. Bus Service 85 is under Loyang Bus Package, Bus Services 800, 803, 804, 805, 806, 807/807A/807B, 811/811A, 812, 851, 851e, 852 and 860 are under Seletar Bus Package, Bus Services 171, 801, 853/853M, 854, 854e, 855, 856, 857/857A/857B and 859 are under Sembawang-Yishun Bus Package, Bus Service 39 is under Tampines Bus Package and Bus Service 103 is under Serangoon-Eunos Bus Package.

Currently, Bus Service 85 (Loyang Bus Package) is operated by Go-Ahead Singapore. Bus Services 171, 801, 853/853M, 854, 854e, 855, 856, 857/857A/857B and 859 (Sembawang-Yishun Bus Package) are currently operated by Tower Transit Singapore. Bus Services 800, 803, 804, 805, 806, 807/807A/807B, 811/811A, 812, 851, 851e, 852 and 860 (Seletar Bus Package), Bus Service 39 (Tampines Bus Package) as well as Bus Service 103 (Serangoon-Eunos Bus Package) are currently operated by SBS Transit.

List of routes

References

External links
 Interchanges and Terminals (SBS Transit)
 Interchange/Terminal (SMRT Buses)

2019 establishments in Singapore
Bus stations in Singapore
Yishun